MTV Fakta XL was a Finnish television station owned and operated by MTV3. It started broadcasting in August 2012.

References

External links
www.mtv3.fi

Defunct television channels in Finland
Television channels and stations established in 2012
Television channels and stations disestablished in 2014